Battus II of Cyrene, sometimes called Eudaimon (the Blessed) or the Latin equivalent  Felix, (flourished ca. 583 to 560 BC) was the third Greek king of Cyrenaica and Cyrene and a member of the Battiad dynasty.

Ancestry
Battus II was the son of the second Cyrenaean king Arcesilaus I and an unknown mother. His paternal grandfather was Battus I, founder of the Greek colony in Africa. Battus II’s sister was the princess Critola and was the maternal aunt to Arcesilaus II. She was also mother to Polyarchus and the future Cyrenaean Queen Eryxo. Eryxo would later marry Battus II's son, Arcesilaus II.

Oracle
An oracle delivered at Delphi encouraged people from various parts from Greece, particularly those in the Peloponnese, Crete and the other islands to settle in Cyrene. Battus also invited Greeks to move to Libya.

The oracle declared that people who would never settle in delightful Libya, would one day regret it. The oracle declared caused a great rush among Greeks to join Cyrene.

Battle of the Well of Thaetis
Adicran dispatched an embassy to the Egyptian Pharaoh Apries. Apries collected his strong force and sent them to Cyrene to declare war on the Greeks. Around 570 BC the Egyptians, Battus and the Cyrenaeans marched to the Well of Thestis in Irasa to engage in war. The Cyrenaeans won against the Egyptian army. Very few Egyptians survived and returned home. Herodotus states that the Egyptians had no warfare experience against the Greeks and they didn’t take this battle seriously. Herodotus also states that this was the first battle that Greeks and Egyptians ever fought against each other.

The victory at The Well of Thestis confirmed the sovereignty of Cyrene and the establishment of Cyrenaica and her new founding cities. Battus also made an alliance with the new Egyptian  Pharaoh Amasis II.

Death
Plutarch considers Battus as a worthy and honourable man. Battus died in 560 BC and was buried near his father and paternal grandfather. Battus’ wife is unknown and was succeeded by his son Arcesilaus II .

See also
 List of Kings of Cyrene

Sources
Herodotus, The Histories, Book 4.
Morkot, R., The Penguin Historical Atlas of Ancient Greece, Penguin Books, The Bath Press - Avon, Great Britain, 1996.
Burn, A R. The Penguin History Greece, Penguin Books, Clay Ltd, St Ives P/C, England, 1990.
Dictionary of Greek and Roman Biography and Mythology: Abaeus-Dysponteus, edited by Sir William Smith
Cyrenaica in Livius.org
"Cyrene" in A Dictionary of Greek and Roman Geography, by William Smith (1873)
Plutarch's Virtues of Women

6th-century BC Greek people
Kings of Cyrene
560 BC deaths
Year of birth unknown
6th-century BC rulers